John Montgomery Dalton (November 9, 1900 – July 7, 1972) was an American attorney and Democratic politician from the state of Missouri. He was the 45th Governor of Missouri and the state's 34th Attorney General.

Personal history
Dalton was born in rural Vernon County, Missouri in 1900 to Frederick Alfred Dalton and Ida Jane Dunlap (née Poage) Dalton. He had three brothers and two sisters. One brother, Sidna P. Dalton, would serve as Chief Justice of the Missouri Supreme Court. He received his secondary education at Columbia High School in Columbia, Missouri, and then attended the University of Missouri where he earned a law degree in 1923.

After passing the Missouri Bar, he returned to southern Missouri, establishing a law practice in Kennett, where he also served as city attorney from 1944-53. John Dalton and his wife Geraldine were the parents of two children. Dalton died July 7, 1972 in Jefferson City, Missouri and is buried in Oak Ridge Cemetery in Kennett.

Political history

John Dalton first entered statewide politics in 1952, running for and winning the first of two consecutive terms as Missouri Attorney General. In November 1960, Dalton won election to be Missouri's 45th Governor, his term running from January 9, 1961 to January 11, 1965.

Governor Dalton signed legislation requiring all passenger vehicles in Missouri to have seat belts and established a drivers license points system for traffic violations. Other actions included securing funding for a new headquarters for the Missouri Highway Patrol, creation of the Ozark National Scenic Riverways, and furthering desegregation of Missouri schools.

Honors
 The Dalton Cardiovascular Research Center at the University of Missouri is named for Dalton.
 A portion of U.S. Highway 412 in Dunklin County bears the name "Governor John M. Dalton Memorial Highway."
 Gov. Dalton was a Master mason, serving as Grand Orator for the Grand Lodge of Missouri.

References

Democratic Party governors of Missouri
Missouri Attorneys General
1900 births
1972 deaths
Hickman High School alumni
University of Missouri alumni
American Presbyterians
20th-century American lawyers
20th-century American politicians